Matthew John Fraser (born May 20, 1990) is a Canadian professional ice hockey left wing. He is currently under contract with EC KAC of the ICE Hockey League (ICEHL). He has previously played in the National Hockey League for the Dallas Stars, Boston Bruins and Edmonton Oilers.

Playing career
Fraser played major junior hockey in the Western Hockey League (WHL), winning the 2010–11 WHL championship with the Kootenay Ice.

On November 17, 2010, the Dallas Stars signed Fraser as a free agent to a three-year entry level contract. Fraser started the 2011–12 season playing with the Stars' top American Hockey League affiliate, the Texas Stars, where he scored 21 goals in his first 40 games. Fraser was leading his AHL team in scoring when, on January 24, 2012, he was called up to the Dallas Stars to make his NHL debut. After one game he was returned to Texas and finished with a franchise high 37 goals, second in the league. On February 25, 2013, he scored his first career NHL goal against the Nashville Predators with Pekka Rinne in net.

On July 4, 2013, Fraser was included in a trade between the Stars and Boston Bruins which sent Loui Eriksson to Boston and Tyler Seguin to Dallas in a seven-player deal. Boston traded Seguin, Rich Peverley and Ryan Button to Dallas for Eriksson, Fraser, Joe Morrow and Reilly Smith.  Fraser and Ryan Spooner were called up by the Boston Bruins from AHL Providence on December 8, 2013.  On May 7, 2014, Fraser was recalled by Boston to make his NHL playoff debut the following day where he scored the overtime winner, giving the Bruins a 1-0 win over the Montreal Canadiens on May 8 to even the Eastern Conference Semifinals series 2-2.

In the 2014–15 season, Fraser was claimed off waivers from the Bruins by the Edmonton Oilers on December 29, 2014. Fraser scored 5 goals in 36 games to end the year with the Oilers; however, he was not retained with a qualifying offer, releasing him to unrestricted free agency.  On July 2, 2015, Fraser signed as a free agent to a one-year, two-way contract with the Winnipeg Jets.

In the 2015–16 season, while with the Jets AHL affiliate, the Manitoba Moose, on February 25, 2016, Fraser was traded by Winnipeg alongside Andrew Ladd and Jay Harrison to the Chicago Blackhawks in exchange for Marko Daňo and a first-round pick in the 2016 NHL Entry Draft.

Unable to crack an NHL roster in a full-time role over five seasons, Fraser left North America as a free agent, signing a one-year deal with Swedish club Rögle BK of the Swedish Hockey League on September 9, 2016. After one season in Rögle, Fraser moved to Austria to compete with Dornbirner EC of the EBEL.

On April 11, 2018, Fraser moved to the neighbouring German DEL league, agreeing to a one-year contract for the 2018–19 season with the Augsburger Panther.

Career statistics

Awards and honors

References

External links

1990 births
Living people
Augsburger Panther players
Boston Bruins players
Canadian ice hockey left wingers
Dallas Stars players
Dornbirn Bulldogs players
EC KAC players
Edmonton Oilers players
Ice hockey people from Alberta
Kootenay Ice players
Manitoba Moose players
Peoria Rivermen (AHL) players
Providence Bruins players
Red Deer Rebels players
Rockford IceHogs (AHL) players
Rögle BK players
Sportspeople from Red Deer, Alberta
Texas Stars players
Undrafted National Hockey League players
Canadian expatriate ice hockey players in Austria
Canadian expatriate ice hockey players in Germany
Canadian expatriate ice hockey players in Sweden